The Sri Yantra, Shri Yantra, or Shri Chakra is a form of mystical diagram (yantra) used in the Shri Vidya school of Hinduism. It consists of nine interlocking triangles - four upward ones which represent Shiva, and five downward ones representing Shakti. All these surround the central point, the bindu. These triangles represent the cosmos and the human body. Because of its nine triangles, Shri Yantra is also known as the Navayoni Chakra. When the two-dimensional Shri Yantra is represented in three dimensions, it is called a Mahameru. Mount Meru derives its name from this shape. In addition to Mount Meru, all other yantras derive from the Shri Yantra.

Appearance
In the 2009 issue of Brahmavidya (the journal of the Adyar Library), Subhash Kak argues that the description of Shri Yantra is identical to the yantra described in the Śrī Sūkta in the Rigveda.

The Sri Yantra's 9 constituent triangles vary in size and shape and intersect to form 43 smaller triangles, organized in 5 concentric levels. Together they represent the totality of the cosmos and express Advaita or non-duality. In the middle, the power point (bindu) represents the cosmic center. The triangles are circumscribed by two concentric circles composed of 8 and 16 petals, representing the lotus of creation and reproductive vital force. The entire configuration is framed by the broken lines of an earth square, representing a temple with four doors open onto the regions of the universe.

Gallery

Symbolism
The worship of the Sri Yantra is central to the Sri Vidya system of Hindu worship. It represents the Goddess in the form of Devi Tripura Sundari, the natural beauty of the three worlds: Bhu Loka (Physical Plane, Consciousness of the Physical Plane), Bhuvar Loka (Antariksha or Intermediate Space, Sub-Consciousness of the Prana) and Swar Loka (Svarga or Heaven or Super-Consciousness of the Divine Mind). The Sri Yantra is the symbol of Hinduism, which is based on the Hindu philosophy of the vedas. The Sri Yantra is the object of devotion in Sri Vidya.

The Shri Yantra represents the evolution of the multiverse as a result of the natural Divine Will of the Godhead Aadi Paraa Shakti. The four upward-pointing isosceles triangles represent the Goddess's masculine embodiment Brahman, while the five downward-pointing triangles symbolize the female embodiment Jagat jannani. The 12 and 15 sides of the four upward and five downward triangles also correspondingly symbolise, on the physical plane, the 12 sidereal zodiac signs of the Sun and 15 'nityas' phase-signs of the Moon.

The Shri Yantra is also known as the nav chakra because it can be seen to consist of nine concentric layers that radiate outward from the bindu. ("Nau" or "nava" means "nine" in Sanskrit.) Each level corresponds to a mudra, a yogini and a specific form of the deity Tripura Sundari along with her mantra. The various deities residing in the nine levels of the Shri Yantra are described in the Devi Khadgamala Mantra. These levels, listed from outermost to innermost, are: Aadyaguru Shankaracharya established Sri Yantra at six places in India including Tirupati Balaji Temple, Srisailam , Bhraramrabika Temple Kolhapur Mahalakshmi Temple ,Tuljabhavani Temple, Kachipuram Sringeri etc. Historical researcher and archeologist Mr. Vishal phutane, knowledgeable in ancient technology and idol science, has scientifically established Sriyantras in Maharashtra and Karnataka..Recently the largest Sriyantra in India has been established in Solapur district on the border of Maharashtra and Karnataka.
Trailokya Mohana, the outermost square, traced in three lines and interrupted by four recessed portals;
Sarvasaa Paripuraka, the outer lotus, consisting of 16 petals;
Sarva Samkshobahana, the inner lotus, consisting of 8 petals;
Sarva Saubhagyadayaka, the outermost ring of small triangles (14 in total);
Sarvarthasadhaka, the next ring of triangles (10 in total);
Sarva Rakshakara, a smaller ring of 10 triangles;
Sarva Rogahara, a ring of 8 small triangles;
Sarva Siddhiprada, one small triangle containing the bindu at its center;
Sarva Anandamaya, the bindu.

See also
 Loka
 Mandala
 Religious symbolism
 Sacred geometry

References

External link

Hindu symbols
Hindu tantra
Indian iconography
Shaktism